Barbara Serwaa Asamoah (born 18 February) is a Ghanaian lawyer and politician. She is a member of the National Democratic Congress and is the current deputy General Secretary of the party.

Politics 
In 2013, she was nominated and appointed into office as the deputy Minister of Land and Natural Resources, a role she served in till her party, the National Democratic Congress lost the elections and handed over to the next government in 2017.

References 

21st-century Ghanaian women politicians
National Democratic Congress (Ghana) politicians
Living people
Women government ministers of Ghana
Year of birth missing (living people)